René de Ribeaupierre (1 March 1889 – 2 December 1935) was a Swiss equestrian. He competed at the 1924 Summer Olympics and the 1928 Summer Olympics.

References

External links
 

1889 births
1935 deaths
Swiss male equestrians
Olympic equestrians of Switzerland
Equestrians at the 1924 Summer Olympics
Equestrians at the 1928 Summer Olympics
Place of birth missing